Ella Seidel (born 14 February 2005) is a German tennis player.

Seidel has a career high WTA singles ranking of world No. 512 , achieved in March 2023, and a career-high doubles ranking of No. 364, achieved in March 2023.

Seidel made her WTA main draw debut at the 2022 Hamburg European Open in the doubles draw partnering Nastasja Schunk, winning her first round match against Elixane Lechemia and Sabrina Santamaria.

Early career
Seidel was born in Hamburg, Germany and attended the Sportgymnasium Alter Teichweg school there, where she was able to graduate high school two years early at the age of 17, allowing her to focus on her tennis career. She also spent time training in Kühlungsborn, a Baltic Sea resort town that her parents owned a holiday home in.

ITF Circuit finals

Doubles: 1 (1 title)

References

External links

2005 births
Living people
German female tennis players
Sportspeople from Hamburg